Brookula finlayi is a species of minute sea snail, a marine gastropod mollusc, unassigned in the superfamily Seguenzioidea.

Distribution
This species is endemic to the Chatham Islands and Three Kings Islands of New Zealand.

References

finlayi
Gastropods described in 1933